Nirmal Kumawat is an Indian politician from the Bharatiya Janata Party and a member of the Rajasthan Legislative Assembly representing the Phulera Vidhan Sabha constituency in Jaipur district, Rajasthan. Kumawat is a three term member of the Rajasthan Legislative Assembly and was first elected to the lower house in 2008.

References

External links 
  Rajasthan Legislative Assembly

Year of birth missing (living people)
Living people
Rajasthan MLAs 2008–2013
Rajasthan MLAs 2013–2018
Rajasthan MLAs 2018–2023
Bharatiya Janata Party politicians from Rajasthan